The 2022 Monza FIA Formula 2 round was a motor racing event held between 9 and 11 September 2022 at the Autodromo Nazionale di Monza, Monza, Italy. It was the penultimate race of the 2022 Formula 2 Championship and was held in support of the 2022 Italian Grand Prix.

Despite retiring in the sprint race, Felipe Drugovich became the 2022 FIA Formula 2 Drivers' Champion with three races to spare. His nearest championship rival, Théo Pourchaire, finished in seventeenth and therefore failed to score the required four points in order to remain in contention for the title. Drugovich's championship victory was the first for an MP Motorsport driver in Formula 2.

Driver changes 
Luca Ghiotto replaced Roy Nissany at DAMS, due to the Israeli driver receiving a race ban after exceeding the annual limit of twelve penalty points on his race licence following the Zandvoort round.

Classification

Qualifying
Jack Doohan took his third pole position of his career by nearly two tenths, ahead of both Kiwi drivers Liam Lawson and Marcus Armstrong.

Notes:
 – Felipe Drugovich was handed a five-place grid penalty for the sprint race after he was found to have set his fastest lap of the session under single yellow flag conditions at Turn 11.

Sprint race 

Notes:
 – Marcus Armstrong originally finished sixth, but was given a five-second time penalty for causing a collision with Liam Lawson.
 – Ayumu Iwasa and Théo Pourchaire both received five-second time penalties for leaving the track and gaining an advantage.

Feature race 

Notes:
 – Tatiana Calderón withdrew from the remainder of the weekend following a medical advice. Thus, Charouz Racing System only ran one car in the Feature Race.
 – Ayumu Iwasa was disqualified from the feature race after it was found that the plank on the Japanese driver’s car was below the maximum thickness required by Article 4.2 of the Technical Regulations. As a result, Enzo Fittipaldi was promoted to the final podium place.

Standings after the event 

Drivers' Championship standings

Teams' Championship standings

 Note: Only the top five positions are included for both sets of standings.
 Note: Bold name includes the Drivers' Champion.

See also 
 2022 Italian Grand Prix
 2022 Monza Formula 3 round

References

External links 
 Official website

Monza
Monza Formula 2
Monza Formula 2